RJG or rjg may refer to:

Ready Jet Go!, a CGI animated television series
RJG Inc., a training and consulting company 
Rajong language, by ISO 639 language code
Rajgram railway station, West Bengal, by railway station code
Robert John Godfrey, a British musician

See also
R. J. G. Savage  (1927–1998), a British palaeontologist